World of Warcraft Classic is a 2019 MMORPG video game developed and published by Blizzard Entertainment. Running alongside the main version of the game, Classic recreates World of Warcraft in the state it was in before the release of its first expansion, The Burning Crusade. It was announced at BlizzCon 2017 and was released globally August 26, 2019. The Burning Crusade Classic and Wrath of the Lich King Classic versions of the game were later released to allow players to progress to those expansions.

Gameplay

Classic recreates the game in the state it was in after patch 1.12.1,  September 2006, before the launch of The Burning Crusade expansion. The maximum level of the player characters is set to 60, all expansion content is absent, and almost all the gameplay mechanics of the original version have been exactly replicated. As the game's multiple expansions have dramatically changed the gameplay over time, Classic allows players to relive the original experience, albeit some modern interface and functional enhancements introduced in later expansions have been integrated, as well as re-patching of bugs and exploits that were present at the original release of patch 1.12.

Players can choose from the eight original races of World of Warcraft: humans, dwarves, gnomes, and night elves for the Alliance, and orcs, trolls, tauren, and the Forsaken for the Horde. The original nine classes are present: druid, hunter, mage, paladin, priest, rogue, shaman, warlock and warrior. As in the original version of the game, only Alliance players can become paladins, and only Horde players can become shamans. Races and classes added in the expansions are not available in the game. The game world is restored to its original, pre-Cataclysm state, and expansion areas such as Outland are not accessible.

To emulate the original game's patch release cycle, content in Classic was released in phases. This means that game content originally released in patches, such as the Blackwing Lair, Ahn'Qiraj, and Naxxramas raids, battlegrounds like Warsong Gulch and Alterac Valley, and certain items and quests, became available after launch according to a six-phase schedule. Unlike the content patches for the original game, these phases did not modify the core game mechanics such as character abilities in any way; the game balance has been set to the 1.12.1 version of the game since release.

Development

The option of Classic servers has been a long-standing request in the World of Warcraft community. Every expansion has removed or replaced old content and introduced controversial or unwanted mechanics, resulting in many players expressing a preference for older versions of the game. For example, the game's first expansion, The Burning Crusade, removed the original level-60 version of Kazzak, and in the process, all of the items that he dropped became forever unobtainable. Burning Crusade also added flying mounts, which were criticized for their effect on world PvP; raised the level cap to 70, which was criticized for making all level 60 content obsolete; and opened the formerly faction-specific Paladin and Shaman classes to both factions. The second expansion, Wrath of the Lich King, removed the original versions of the Naxxramas and Onyxia raids and all items that could be obtained from them; added a Random Dungeon Finder tool, which many players felt spoiled the "social aspect" of the game; and made certain UI improvements that were criticized for reducing the need to read quest descriptions. Blizzard repeatedly refused to create legacy servers so that players could stay on older versions of the game. One of their oldest refusals was posted on February 21, 2008, by Drysc, who stated "We were at one time internally discussing the possibility fairly seriously, but the long term interest in continued play on them couldn't justify the extremely large amount of development and support resources it would take to implement and maintain them. We'd effectively be developing and supporting two different games."

Versions of World of Warcraft that existed prior to the launch of The Burning Crusade were often referred to as "vanilla" by players, but were referred to by Blizzard as "classic" at least as far back as November 29, 2009, when Vaneras wrote "We occasionally see requests for us to open pre-TBC realms, or classic realms if you prefer. Lately there have also been requests for pre-WotLK realms, and I am sure that once the next expansion pack is released there will be requests for pre-Cataclysm realms as well. We have answered these requests quite a few times now saying that we have no plans to open such realms, and this is still the case today. We have no plans to open classic realms or limited expansion content realms".

Demand for Classic and other legacy realms significantly increased when the Cataclysm expansion revamped the entire original game world, making the majority of the classic or "old world" content forever inaccessible. Blizzard's response at the time, as provided by Tom Chilton, was "Currently, my answer would be probably not. The reason I say that is because any massively multiplayer game that has pretty much ever existed and has ever done any expansions has always gotten the nostalgia of, 'Oh God, wouldn't it be great if we could have classic servers!' and more than anything else that generally proves to be nostalgia. In most cases - in almost all cases - the way it ends up playing out is that the game wasn't as good back then as people remember it being and then when those servers become available, they go play there for a little bit and quickly remember that it wasn't quite as good as what they remembered in their minds and they don't play there anymore and you set up all these servers and you dedicated all this hardware to it and it really doesn't get much use. So, for me, the historical lesson is that it's not a very good idea to do". When the issue was raised at a Q&A panel at Blizzcon 2013, J Allen Brack famously responded "You think you do, but you don't", a phrase which would become the subject of ridicule years later.

Meanwhile, many private servers were being created by the community. Originally, private servers were mere novelties used for experimenting with alterations to the game rules, such as raising the level cap to 255. These early servers rarely had properly scripted raids, quests, or anything else. However, as expansions progressed and demand for legacy realms grew, private servers reversed focus and were seen as a way to faithfully re-create older versions of the game. Private servers emphasizing fidelity to the official versions of the game were referred to as "Blizzlike" and included Feenix, Molten Core, Emerald Dream, Nostalrius, and Light's Hope. The most popular was Nostalrius, which opened in February 2015 and had 800,000 registered accounts and 150,000 active players when it shut down in response to a cease and desist letter on April 10, 2016. In the wake of Nostalrius's shutdown, a Change.org petition for official Classic servers was created and received over 200,000 signatures, and ex-World of Warcraft team lead Mark Kern personally delivered it to Blizzard's president at the time, Michael Morhaime. Blizzard acknowledged the community's desires, and stated they had been discussing legacy servers internally for years but technical problems prevented them from implementing them. Consequently, the Nostalrius team released their source code to Valkyrie-WoW, another long-standing private Vanilla WoW server, hosted in Russia, and the Nostalrius servers returned on December 17, 2016, under the name of Elysium Project, with the player database as it had been just before the shutdown in April.

On November 3, 2017, at BlizzCon 2017, the then-Executive Producer of World of Warcraft, J. Allen Brack, announced Classic on stage during the WoW panel. Details of the project were further revealed in interviews: it was going to be a faithful recreation of the original version of the game, but running on the modern infrastructure. A developer blog post published on June 15, 2018, further detailed the technical implementation, and a panel was held during BlizzCon 2018 that explained the development process behind the game. To create Classic, Blizzard ported the original 1.12.1 game data and assets to their modern server and client infrastructure. This allows Classic to share much of the source code between the modern version of the game, which removes the development overhead of maintaining two different versions of the game, and also means that Classic will have all the performance and security improvements added to the original game server and client that were absent in the 2006 version.

Burning Crusade Classic
In March 2020 Blizzard sent out a survey to Classic players gauging their interest in a Classic Burning Crusade game. After positive reactions it was verified in February 2021 and in the last week of May it became available for download leading up to its release on June 1.

Wrath of the Lich King Classic
In April 2022, Blizzard announced Wrath of the Lich King Classic, scheduled for release later in the year. On July 25, Blizzard released a trailer with the confirmed release date of September 26.

At the launch of the Classic addition, the developers tried to stick to a strategy of minimal changes, reproducing the game as close to the original state as possible. They don't want to introduce adjustments that violate the original spirit of the old additions, so there are no global innovations planned.

The changes include:
 Increasing the health and damage of creatures in the Naxramas raid, in order to maintain interest and a healthy playing environment, as it was originally too easy and players quickly passed it;
 Emblems for completing heroic dungeons have been introduced, in order to motivate players to visit dungeons throughout the supplement;
 Eliminating the introduction of equal loot in 10/25 player raids, as well as improving the quality of loot and the basic difficulty level of heroic dungeons;
 Eliminating the system of automatic inter-server group gathering in the early stages of the addition and improving the system of manual group gathering;
 Players will no longer need to reach level 55 to create Death Knights.
 Replacing gender selection when creating a character with a choice of body types (body 1, body2);
 Introduction of the ability to change physique in the hairdresser's shop for gold;
 many PvP-related changes.
With the start of the second content phase, a new "rune of titans" system became available for heroic dungeons, complicating the dungeon with a certain modifier and rewarding more generous loot. The system has similarities to the epoch keys from Legion, but the current variation has no time counter and no in-game rating.

Reception

PC Gamer scored Classic an 80 out of 100 and wrote, "WoW Classic is more than just a new version of an iconic game, it feels like a window to a time where interacting with people online still felt novel and exciting." Polygon praised the difficulty of Classic and its overall design to nurture "social connections" in comparison to its modern counterpart, calling it a "faithful snapshot of a moment in time".

Since launch, Blizzard has faced some criticism from players for their use of layering technology for the Classic servers. In addition to splitting the communities within each unique realm, players were found to be using the "layers" to exploit the in-game economy. However, as of October 10, 2019, most realms are down to a single layer, with only the highest population servers still utilizing additional layers.

The game won the award for "PC Game of the Year" at the 2019 Golden Joystick Awards, and was nominated for "Game, Classic Revival" at the NAVGTR Awards.

References

External links
 

2019 video games
Active massively multiplayer online games
Blizzard games
Golden Joystick Award winners
MacOS games
Massively multiplayer online role-playing games
Video games developed in the United States
Windows games
World of Warcraft